Nripen Chakraborty (4 April 1905 – 25 December 2004) was an Indian Communist politician who served as the Chief minister of Tripura state from 1978 to 1988.  Nripen Chakraborty was involved in the Communist movement in India for six decades.

Life
He was born at Bikrampur in Dhaka District of Bengal province of British India (present-day Bangladesh). He was the ninth child of Rajkumar and Uttamsunadari Chakraborty. He passed the entrance examination from Outsahi High School in 1925. He left his studies in Dhaka University to join the Indian freedom movement. In 1931, he took part in the civil disobedience movement. He joined the Communist Party of India in 1934. He was elected secretary of the Bengal unit of the party in 1937. In 1950, he was sent to Tripura by the party, and became an important organizer there. After the split in the CPI in 1964, he joined Communist Party of India (Marxist). He became the secretary of the state unit of CPI(M) in 1967. He was elected to the Central Committee of the CPI(M) in 1972 and to its Polit Bureau in June 1984.

In Tripura
Nripen Chakraborty was elected to the Tripura Territorial Council in 1957, and became the leader of the opposition in 1962. After Tripura’s attainment of full statehood, he became the member of the state Vidhan Sabha in 1972. In 1977, he was a minister in two successive short-lived coalition governments, first between the Left parties and the Congress for Democracy (CFD) and then between the Left and the Janata Party. When the Left Front won the elections on 31 December 1977, to the Vidhan Sabha of Tripura state, he became the chief minister and continued in office till 1988. After the defeat of the Left Front in 1988 elections, he became the leader of the opposition in Tripura Vidhan Sabha from 1988 to 1993. In 1993 elections, the Left Front again came back to the power in Tripura and he became the chairman of the State Planning Board. In 1995 he was expelled from the CPI(M), but he remained a member of the Vidhan Sabha tiil 1998.

As a journalist
During 1939–41, he worked as a sub-editor in the Ananda Bazar Patrika. He was also the co-editor of the Swadhinata, the CPI organ in Bengali. Later, he was a regular columnist in the daily Desher Katha, the mouthpiece of the CPI(M) Tripura state unit, often under his pen-name, Arup Roy till 1995.

The last days
In December 2004 he became seriously ill and was brought to SSKM Hospital in Kolkata. On 24 December 2004, the Polit Bureau of CPI(M) decided to readmit him. He died on 25 December 2004, following a cardiac arrest.

References

External links
 
 

1905 births
2004 deaths
Communist Party of India (Marxist) politicians from Tripura
20th-century Bengalis
Chief Ministers of Tripura
Indian Marxist journalists
University of Dhaka alumni
People from Bikrampur
Chief ministers from Communist Party of India (Marxist)
Tripura MLAs 1977–1983
Tripura politicians
20th-century Indian journalists
Indian male journalists
Tripura MLAs 1983–1988
Tripura MLAs 1988–1993